Megacyllene angulifera is a species of beetle in the family Cerambycidae occurring in central North America from Alberta to Texas. It was described by Casey in 1912.

References

Megacyllene
Beetles described in 1912